is a Japanese professional rock climber, sport climber and boulderer. At the 2019 IFSC Climbing World Championships, she became the youngest Japanese athlete to finish in a podium place in the competition, third in lead. She has won Japan Cup titles in both bouldering and lead disciplines, and has multiple IFSC Climbing World Cup podium finishes, including three gold medals in World Cup events in 2022.

Climbing career
In 2016, Mori won Lead Japan Cup, becoming the youngest winner of the competition at age 12.
She has repeated as the national lead champion in 2018, 2020, 2021 and 2022. Mori has also won the Boulder Japan Cup in 2021 and finished second in 2018.

Mori made her senior international debut in 2019, winning two bronze medals in lead and one in bouldering World Cups. Later that year, she placed third in the lead category at the IFSC Climbing World Championships, becoming the youngest Japanese climber, at age 15, to medal at the World Championship. Akiyo Noguchi had held the previous record with her 2005 bronze medal in lead at age 16. In November and December 2019, Mori finished fifth in the combined category at the Olympic qualifying event in Toulouse, France. However, Japan had already filled its athlete quota for the 2020 Olympic Games, so Mori did not compete at the Games despite finishing in qualifying places. 

In September 2022, Mori took first place at the World Cup event in Koper, Slovenia, finishing ahead of second-place finisher Janja Garnbret, who had won all four lead World Cups of the season coming into Koper. Mori was competing in her first World Cup event of the year, and her first international event of any kind since the 2020 Olympic qualifying event in 2019. She followed this up with first place finishes in another two World Cups events, at the lead event in Edinburgh, Scotland, and the season-ending combined boulder and lead event in Morioka, Japan.

Rankings

World Cup

World Championships

Asian Youth Championships

Japan Cup

World Cup podiums

Lead

Bouldering

Combined (Boulder & Lead)

References

External links

2003 births
Female climbers
Japanese rock climbers
Japanese sportswomen
Living people
Sportspeople from Ibaraki Prefecture
21st-century Japanese women
IFSC Climbing World Championships medalists